Kurt "Frenchy" Yaghjian (or Yahjian; born February 9, 1951, Detroit) is an Armenian-American actor and singer known for his appearance as Annas in the 1973 film Jesus Christ Superstar.

Biography
Kurt Yaghjian is the only son of Haig Yaghjian, a former assistant conductor of the Cincinnati Symphony Orchestra, and was a member of a school choir that participated in the premiere of Gian Carlo Menotti's The Death of the Bishop of Brindisi in May 1963. He is of Armenian descent. Menotti was impressed with the expressiveness of Yaghjian's face and recommended him to NBC for the role of Amahl in Amahl and the Night Visitors in 1963, the first time that the production was videotaped, previous versions having been shown live. The videotaped version with Yaghjian was shown annually until 1966. In 1971 he graduated from North Carolina School of the Arts.

He has taken part in advertising campaigns for products such as Coca-Cola, Ford Motors, Domino's Pizza, Toyota, Cadillac, Chevrolet, Budweiser and Sprite.

He appeared in the original Broadway production of Jesus Christ Superstar from 12 October 1971 to 30 June 1973 as a leper, a reporter and as understudy to Ben Vereen as Judas Iscariot.

Yaghjian recorded backing vocals for Milk and Honey album of John Lennon and Yoko Ono and It's Alright (I See Rainbows) album of Yoko Ono. He recorded backing vocals for the Road to Nowhere of Talking Heads in 1985, and for the Let the River Run of Carly Simon in 1988.

From the early 1990s until after the events of September 11, 2001 Yaghjian was in a band called Little Isidore and the Inquisitors. In October 2001 he joined another band called Kenny Vance and the Planotones. His musical appearances include Amahl in the television movie Amahl and the Night Visitors (1963), Annas in Jesus Christ Superstar (1973) (film and soundtrack), and Hair (1979).

See also
 This Jesus Must Die

References

External links

Yaghjian on 'The Ultimate Jesus Christ Superstar' website
Images of Yaghjian in Amahl and the Night Visitors
An Interview of Kurt Yaghjian with Tom Meros

1951 births
American male singers
American male film actors
Male actors from Baltimore
Living people
American people of Armenian descent
University of North Carolina School of the Arts alumni